Parliamentary elections were held in Lebanon on 7 June 2009 to elect all 128 members of the Parliament of Lebanon.

Background 

Before the election, the voting age was to be lowered from 21 to 18 years, but as this requires a constitutional amendment, it did not happen before the election.

Allocation of seats 
Following a compromise reached in the Doha Agreement in May 2008 between the government and opposition, a new electoral law was put in place, as shown in the table below. It was passed on 29 September 2008.

Results 

Preliminary results indicated that the turnout had been as high as 55%. The March 14 Alliance garnered 71 seats in the 128-member parliament, while the March 8 Alliance won 57 seats. This result is virtually the same as the result from the election in 2005. However, the March 14 alliance saw this as a moral victory over Hezbollah, who led the March 8 Alliance, and the balance of power was expected to shift in its favor.  Many observers expect to see the emergence of a National Unity Government similar to that created following the Doha Agreement in 2008.

By party after the designation of Najib Mikati in January 2011 

|-
! style="background-color:#E9E9E9;text-align:left;" |Alliances
! style="background-color:#E9E9E9;text-align:right;" |Seats
! style="background-color:#E9E9E9;text-align:left;" |Parties
! style="background-color:#E9E9E9;text-align:right;" |Seats
|-
|style="text-align:center;vertical-align:top;" rowspan=15 |Government68
|style="background-color:orange;vertical-align:top;text-align:right;" rowspan=6 |27
|style="background-color:orange;text-align:left;" colspan=2 |Change and Reform bloc
|-
| style="text-align:left;" | Free Patriotic Movement (Tayyar Al-Watani Al-Horr)
| style="text-align:right;" |19
|-
| style="text-align:left;" | Lebanese Democratic Party (Hizb al-democraty al-lubnany)
| style="text-align:right;" |2
|-
| style="text-align:left;" | Marada Movement
| style="text-align:right;" |3
|-
| style="text-align:left;" | Armenian Revolutionary Federation (Tashnag)
| style="text-align:right;" |2
|-
| style="text-align:left;" | Solidarity Party (Hizb Al-Tadamon Al-Lubnany)
| style="text-align:right;" |1
|-
|style="background-color:yellow;vertical-align:top;text-align:right;" rowspan=5 |30
|style="background-color:yellow;text-align:left;" colspan=2 |March 8 Alliance
|-
| style="text-align:left;" | Amal Movement (Harakat Amal)
| style="text-align:right;" |13
|-
| style="text-align:left;" | Loyalty to the Resistance (Hezbollah)
| style="text-align:right;" |13
|-
| style="text-align:left;" | Syrian Social Nationalist Party (al-Hizb al-Qawmi al-souri al ijtima'i)
| style="text-align:right;" |2
|-
| style="text-align:left;" | Arab Socialist Ba'ath Party
| style="text-align:right;" |2
|-
|style="background-color:lightgrey;vertical-align:top;text-align:right;" rowspan=4 |11
|style="background-color:lightgrey;text-align:left;" colspan=2 |Pro-Government Independents
|-
| style="text-align:left;" | Progressive Socialist Party
| style="text-align:right;" |7
|-
| style="text-align:left;" | Glory Movement
| style="text-align:right;" |2
|-
| style="text-align:left;" | Safadi Bloc
| style="text-align:right;" |2
|-
|style="text-align:center;vertical-align:top;" rowspan=11 |Opposition 60
|style="background-color:#5bb9ee;vertical-align:top;text-align:right;" rowspan=11 |60
|style="background-color:#5bb9ee;text-align:left;" colspan=2 |March 14 Alliance
|-
| style="text-align:left;" | Future Movement (Tayyar Al Mustaqbal)
| style="text-align:right;" |29
|-
| style="text-align:left;" | Lebanese Forces (al-Quwāt al-Lubnāniyya)
| style="text-align:right;" |8
|-
| style="text-align:left;" | Kataeb Party (Hizb al-Kataeb)
| style="text-align:right;" |5
|-
| style="text-align:left;" | Murr Bloc
| style="text-align:right;" |2
|-
| style="text-align:left;" | Social Democrat Hunchakian Party (Social Democrat Hunchakian Party)
| style="text-align:right;" |2
|-
| style="text-align:left;" |  Islamic Group (Jamaa al-Islamiya)
| style="text-align:right;" |1
|-
| style="text-align:left;" | Armenian Democratic Liberal Party (Ramgavar Party)
| style="text-align:right;" |1
|-
| style="text-align:left;" | Democratic Left Movement (ĥarakatu-l-yasāri-d-dimuqrātī)
| style="text-align:right;" |1
|-
| style="text-align:left;" | National Liberal Party (Hizbu-l-waTaniyyīni-l-aHrār)
| style="text-align:right;" |1
|-
| style="text-align:left;" | Independents (including ex-PSP)
| style="text-align:right;" |10
|-
|  –
|  –
! style="text-align:left;" rowspan="6"|Total
! style="text-align:right;" |128
|-
|}
Source

Formation of government 

As is typical of Lebanese politics political wrangling after the elections took 5 months.  Only in November was the composition of the new cabinet agreed upon: 15 seats for the March 14 Alliance, 10 for the March 8 Alliance, and 5 nominated by Lebanese President Michel Suleiman, who has cast himself as a neutral party between the two main political blocks.

Aftermath 
The government fell in January 2011 after the March 8 alliance's 11 ministers withdrew from the government over PM Hariri's refusal to convene a cabinet meeting to discuss possible indictments to be issued by the Special Tribunal for Lebanon.

The March 8 alliance formed a new government in the ensuing six months.

See also 

2005 Lebanese general election

References

External links 
 Official Site
 Foreign Money Seeks to Buy Lebanese Votes, Robert Worth, April 22, 2009, The New York Times
 Lebanese Elections 2009 BLOG
 Interactive Result Map
 Obama's Path Passes Through Lebanon by Pol Marillas, Opinion, June 2009; European Union Institute for Security Studies

2009 elections in Asia
General election
2009 general
Michel Aoun